Belial is a term or character in the Bible and Jewish mythology.

Belial may also refer to:
Belial in popular culture
Belial (Dungeons & Dragons)